Judy Erickson is a Canadian curler and curling coach.

Teams

Record as a coach of national teams

References

External links
 
 Judy Erickson – Curling Canada Stats Archive

Living people
Canadian women curlers
Curlers from Calgary
Curlers from Edmonton
Canadian women's curling champions
Canadian curling coaches
Year of birth missing (living people)